The Texas Bullets were a team in the Professional Indoor Football League (PIFL) in 1998. The Bullets franchise was owned by Wayne Stigler, who also was the team's head coach. The Bullets played their home games at the Bell County Expo Center in Belton, TX., with the team offices located in Temple, TX. The team's color's were: Black, Turquoise, & Silver. The Bullets suffered disappointing attendance and the costs of taking the team on a road trip to Hawaii to take on the Honolulu Hurricanes, proved too much. The team folded after ten regular season games. Of the eight clubs that were in the first batch of PIFL franchises in '98, six still existed. The Bullets franchise was moved to Austin, TX. in 1999 and renamed the Texas Terminators in the renamed Indoor Professional Football League.

The Bullets played three preseason PIFL games in 1997-1998. All were losses on the road:

December 20, 1997 - Texas Bullets 22 at Utah Catzz 47 F
March 28, 1998 - Texas Bullets 39 at Louisiana Bayou Beast 62 F
April 6, 1998 - Texas Bullets 9 at Colorado Wildcats 49 F

Texas Bullets 1998 Schedule
April 11 - Texas Bullets 19, at Green Bay Bombers 47
April 18 - Texas Bullets 24, at Utah Catzz 57
April 25 - Honolulu Hurricanes 46, at Texas Bullets 40
May 2 - Texas Bullets 28, at Madison Mad Dogs 35
May 9 - Minnesota Monsters 32, at Texas Bullets 34 (OT)
May 16 - Texas Bullets 49, at Green Bay Bombers 71
May 23 - Texas Bullets 51, at Louisiana Bayou Beast 56
May 31 - Madison Mad Dogs 44, at Texas Bullets 46
June 7 - Texas Bullets 28, at Colorado Wildcats 51
June 13 - Louisiana Bayou Beast 40, at Texas Bullets 37
July 4 - Texas Bullets at Honolulu Hurricanes - Texas forfeits
July 18 - Utah Catzz at Texas Bullets - Texas forfeits 
July 25 - Texas Bullets at Minnesota Monsters - both teams forfeit
August 1 - Colorado Wildcats at Texas Bullets - Texas forfeits

Texas Bullets 1998 Roster
Anthony Allen (East Texas State) DB/WR

John Henry (Baylor) RB
Lamont Moore (Baylor) WR/DB
Brent Alford (Baylor) WR/QB
Greg Bower (Texas) DL/LB
Butch Hadnot (Texas) RB
Lee McCormick (Murray State) WR
Jackie Warren (Waco Midway HS) WR
Kevin Ward (Texas Tech) OL
Marc Saldana (Texas Tech) QB
Trey Burke (East Texas State) OL
Ken Otte (Texas) DL
Bryan Blake (Tarleton State) LB
Scott Carey (Tarleton State) OL
Adrian Coe DB
Joey Tate (Eisenhower HS) DB
Rolf Schaeffer K
Billy Watkins (East Texas State) K
Tim Cook (none) OL/DL
Matthew House (UOP/SRJC) LB
Kevin Carter  (U S Navy) LB / Coach
Bobby Craig DB

References

Professional Indoor Football League teams
Defunct American football teams in Texas
American football teams established in 1998
American football teams disestablished in 1998